16 Biggest Hits is a compilation album by country singer Willie Nelson. It was released on July 14, 1998.

The album was certified Platinum in 2002 by the RIAA. It has sold 1,852,000 copies in the US as of May 2013.

Track listing

Chart performance
16 Biggest Hits peaked at #29 on the U.S. Billboard Top Country Albums chart the week of July 3, 1999.

Weekly charts

Year-end charts

References

Nelson, Willie
1998 greatest hits albums
Willie Nelson compilation albums
Columbia Records compilation albums
Albums produced by Sydney Pollack
Albums produced by Chips Moman